Veronika Harcsa (born October 8, 1982 in Budapest, Hungary) is a Hungarian jazz singer and songwriter, known to be active in various musical genres. She has received the Hungarian Music Award for Best Jazz Album and Best Alternative Album.

Career
She started university at Budapest University of Technology and Economics, but switched to Liszt Academy of Music, graduating in 2008. She earned her Master's degree in 2014 from the Royal Conservatory of Brussels.

Her current main project is a duo with guitar player Balint Gyémánt. Their second album "Tell Her" was released on Traumton Records in February 2017 to critical acclaim.

Veronika founded her first jazz band, a quartet, in 2005. Between 2006 and 2011 this formation released four albums, two of which reached the top of the vocal jazz charts at Tower Records, Japan. Besides her jazz career, she has gained success on the alternative music scene in Hungary, collaborating with the Erik Sumo Band and the Pannonia Allstars Ska Orchestra. She also featured on two albums of the experimental electronic trio Bin-Jip as well as a musical and literary project based on works by the Hungarian avant-garde poet Lajos Kassák. She was awarded "Best Voice of Budapest Fringe" at Budapest Fringe Festival in 2007.

In 2014, she became a permanent artist in residence at the Valley of Arts Festival in Kapolcs, Hungary, where she is responsible for the jazz program of the cult ten-day annual festival.

In 2014–15 Veronika Harcsa ran a monthly concert series in Berlin, presenting guest musicians from the local scene including David Friedman, Julia Hülsmann, Samuel Blaser and David Helbock.

The duo with Bálint Gyémánt was showcased at the Jazzahead! 2015 European Jazz Meeting.

Harcsa has performed at festivals and clubs in over 25 countries worldwide. She has collaborated with Erik Truffaz, Enrico Pieranunzi, Kris Defoort, Nicola Conte, the Franz Liszt Chamber Orchestra, Concerto Budapest and many others.

Discography
 Harcsa Veronika: Speak Low (2005 self release HU and 2007 Nature Bliss, Japan)
 Harcsa Veronika: You Don't Know It's You (2008 self release HU and Nature Bliss, Japan)
 Harcsa Veronika: Red Baggage (2009 self release HU and Nature Bliss, Japan)
 Bin-Jip: Enter (2010 LAB6 Records HU and Whereabouts Records, Japan)
 Harcsa Veronika: Lámpafény (2011 self release HU and Whereabouts Records, Japan)
 Harcsa Veronika – Gyémánt Bálint: Lifelover (2014 Traumton Records)
 Bin-Jip: Live at the Planetarium (DVD and Blu-ray, 2014 self release HU)
 Bin-Jip: Heavy (2014 LAB6 Records HU and Whereabouts Records, Japan)
 Harcsa/Keszég/Márkos/Benkő/Pándi: Kassák (2015 self release HU)
 Harcsa Veronika – Gyémánt Bálint: Tell Her (2017 Traumton Records)

Awards and nominations

See also
Hungarian alternative
Pannonia Allstars Ska Orchestra
Bin-Jip

References

External links
Harcsa Veronika official website

1982 births
Living people
Musicians from Budapest
Hungarian jazz singers
Franz Liszt Academy of Music alumni
Budapest University of Technology and Economics alumni
21st-century Hungarian women singers